The Kenya national cricket team toured South Africa from 30 September to 24 October 2001 and played in six One Day Internationals against South Africa and India, competing in the Standard Bank Triangular Tournament.

ODI series
 South Africa v India at Wanderers Stadium, Johannesburg – South Africa won by 6 wickets
 South Africa v Kenya at Willowmoore Park Main Oval, Benoni – South Africa won by 7 wickets
 South Africa v India at Supersport Park, Centurion – India won by 41 runs
 India v Kenya at St George's Park, Port Elizabeth – Kenya won by 70 runs
 South Africa v Kenya at Newlands Cricket Ground, Cape Town – South Africa won by 208 runs
 India v Kenya at Boland Bank Park, Paarl – India won by 186 runs

Despite their win against India, Kenya failed to reach the final, which was won by South Africa.

References

External links
 

2001–02 South African cricket season
2001 in South African cricket
2001-02
International cricket competitions in 2001–02
September 2001 sports events in Africa
October 2001 sports events in Africa